Reyna Araceli Tirado Gálvez (born 25 September 1982) is a Mexican politician from the Institutional Revolutionary Party. In 2012 she served as Deputy of the LXI Legislature of the Mexican Congress representing Sinaloa.

References

1982 births
Living people
Women members of the Chamber of Deputies (Mexico)
Institutional Revolutionary Party politicians
21st-century Mexican politicians
21st-century Mexican women politicians
Autonomous University of Sinaloa alumni
Deputies of the LXI Legislature of Mexico
Members of the Chamber of Deputies (Mexico) for Sinaloa